Cindy Cheung (born January 27, 1970) is a Chinese American actress, best known for playing the role of Young-Soon Choi in Lady in the Water and Elaine Cheng in Children of Invention. In 2021, she portrayed Stephanie Lam in season 4 of The Sinner.

Career

Cheung is a founding member of Mr. Miyagi's Theatre Company and has a MFA in acting from the American Conservatory Theater in San Francisco. She debuted her solo show Speak Up Connie, directed by BD Wong, in January 2012.

In 2021, she portrayed Stephanie Lam in 7 episodes of The Sinner (season 4).

Personal life
In 2002, Cheung married Ed Lin, a novelist.

Filmography

Film

Television

References

External links
 

1970 births
20th-century American actresses
21st-century American actresses
Actresses from California
American actresses of Chinese descent
American film actresses
American television actresses
Living people